Andrew Hunter Murray is an English writer, podcaster and comedian.

Early life
Murray went to school at King's College School in Wimbledon.

Career
Murray is a writer and researcher for the BBC panel show QI, as a member of the team known as the "QI Elves". He co-hosts the spin-off podcast series No Such Thing as a Fish in which he and three other QI Elves – Anna Ptaszynski, James Harkin and Dan Schreiber – share their favourite facts from the week. Murray wrote and co-presented the podcast's spinoff television series, No Such Thing As The News. He currently hosts "Drop us a line" as part of the Club Fish podcast. 

Murray works for Ian Hislop as a writer for Private Eye magazine and hosts the magazine's podcast, Page 94.

Murray's debut novel, The Last Day, a dystopian thriller set in a future where the Earth has stopped spinning, was published in February 2020. Film and TV rights for the novel have been sold to Stone Village Television. His second book, The Sanctuary, was published in May 2022.

Murray is a member of the Jane Austen-themed improvisational comedy troupe Austentatious.

In February 2021, Murray appeared as a contestant on episodes 76–80 of the fourth series of BBC Two's Richard Osman's House of Games.

References

External links
Andrew Hunter Murray on Chortle.
Andy Murray on IMDb.

Living people
British male journalists
British male novelists
Writers from London
1987 births

British podcasters